Oleksandr Gordiienko (born 21 January 1991) is a Ukrainian judoka.

He is the gold medallist of the 2018 Judo Grand Prix Tbilisi in the +100 kg category.

References

External links
 

1991 births
Living people
Ukrainian male judoka
Recipients of the Order of Danylo Halytsky
Judoka at the 2015 European Games
European Games medalists in judo
European Games bronze medalists for Ukraine